Ohio Boulevard–Deming Park Historic District is a boulevard in Terre Haute, Vigo County, Indiana.

At its start at the intersection with 19th Street is an entrance including a stone structure on either side of the road.

The median is maintained by the city of Terre Haute as city park land. In the teardrop-shaped green space formed as the boulevard branches and widens between 19th and 20th streets is a fountain, restored in 2002. This small area was dedicated as Remembrance Plaza on September 11, 2002, in honor of those who lost their lives in the September 11 attacks one year prior.

The boulevard was placed on the National Register of Historic Places in 1989 for its significance in architecture, landscaping and the history of the region.

Deming Park
Demas Deming Jr., the son of an early settler of Terre Haute, began developing the district on a large tract of land owned by his family. Using money acquired from the sale of another parcel of land to the city of Terre Haute that became Deming Park, around 1921 the Deming family created a scenic boulevard with a scenic parkway in the middle stretching from 19th Street to Fruitridge Avenue.

References

Historic districts on the National Register of Historic Places in Indiana
Colonial Revival architecture in Indiana
Tudor Revival architecture in Indiana
Historic districts in Terre Haute, Indiana
National Register of Historic Places in Terre Haute, Indiana